Morvin Te Anatipa Simon  (1944 – 14 May 2014) was a New Zealand Māori composer, kapa haka leader, choirmaster and historian.

Biography
Born at Kaiwhaiki marae on the Whanganui River, Simon was of Te Āti Haunui-a-Pāpārangi, Ngāti Apa and Ngāti Tūwharetoa descent. He was educated at Upokongaro School and Hato Paora College, and studied sociology and philosophy at Holy Name Seminary in Christchurch, and Māori language and oral literature at Victoria University of Wellington and Massey University.

Simon succeeded his father as choirmaster at Kaiwhaiki, recording the series of albums The Valley of Voices, volume 2 of which was a finalist for best Polynesian album at the 1983 New Zealand Music Awards. He composed hundreds of songs, including classics such as Te Aroha (1983), and Moe, moe mai rā adapted from the Welsh lullaby Suo Gân, and others for special occasions including one in memory of Sir Archie Taiaroa. He was the leader of the kapa haka groups Te Matapihi and Te Taikura o te Awa Tupua.

An expert in the Māori language, Simon was appointed an adjunct professor by Te Wānanga o Aotearoa in 2004. He wrote a series of books Taku Whare E about the marae in the Whanganui region, with the third and final book focusing on his home marae of Kaiwhaiki.

In 2012, Simon was awarded an honorary Bachelor of Arts in Māori Performing Arts by Te Whare Wānanga o Awanuiārangi, in recognition of his contribution to kapa haka and cultural stewardship. In the 2013 Queen's Birthday Honours, he was appointed a Member of the New Zealand Order of Merit, for services to Māori. At the same time, his wife, Titikura Simon, was awarded the Queen's Service Medal, also for services to Māori.

Simon died in Wellington in 2014. Māori Party co-leader Tariana Turia paid tribute to Simon, saying "his waiata could move from tempestuous rapids to smooth waters that caress your every trouble away."

References

External links
 

1944 births
2014 deaths
Te Āti Haunui-a-Pāpārangi people
Ngāti Apa people
Ngāti Tūwharetoa people
People from Manawatū-Whanganui
Victoria University of Wellington alumni
Massey University alumni
New Zealand Māori academics
Members of the New Zealand Order of Merit
Academic staff of Te Wānanga o Aotearoa
21st-century New Zealand historians
Holy Name Seminary alumni
People educated at Hato Paora College